Arthur Xhignesse (born 1873, died 1941) was a Belgian writer who worked mainly in the Walloon language.  Most of his works are short; his first book, Les pôves diâles, was written in 1907.

Belgian writers in Walloon
1873 births
1941 deaths